Carlos Adolfo "Lucho" Sosa (21 July 1919 – 2 March 2009) was an Argentine footballer who played as a midfielder. He spent most of his career in Boca Juniors, where he won six titles. With the Argentina national team he also won two Copa América.

Sosa is considered one of the best right halves in the history of Argentine football, apart from being an emblematic player of Boca Juniors during the 1940s.

Playing career
Sosa started his career with Atlanta, debuting in Primera División on 30 July 1939 v Chacarita Juniors. His initial position was left back. Sosa's good performances on the field sparkled interest in Boca Juniors, which finally acquired Sosa for $25,000 plus the transfers of players Vilana, Tenorio and Angeletti. Boca also gave Atlanta the ...... of a friendly match played in Ferro Carril Oeste stadium. His last match with Atlanta was on 22 December 1940 v Independiente, playing a total of 40 games with the club.

At his arrival to Boca Juniors, Sosa played several matches in lower divisions until he was promoted to the first squad in 1941, being part of a memorable midfield line along with Ernesto Lazzatti and Natalio Pescia. At the end of the year 1951, he left for France to play with RC Paris and Red Star, where he ended his career in 1958. He played a total of 271 matches with Boca Juniors, also scoring 7 goals. With the Xeneize Sosa also won six titles, including two Primera División championships.

Sosa left Boca Juniors after 10 years in the club, being replaced by Francisco Lombardo. Sosa continued his career in France when he joined Racing Club Paris. Sosa stayed here for seven years, playing as inside forward and central midfielder.

Managerial career
After retiring from football, he became manager, coaching Boca Juniors in 1960, but after matchday 10 of the championship in July – 4 wins, 5 draws, 1 defeat, 17–9 goals – he resigned because of the unsuccessful results. José D'Amico, who later coached the national team for several matches, followed him in the office. Sosa was also manager of San Telmo and Uruguayan club Racing Club de Montevideo.

Playing style
Sosa was a skillful player with good ball control, which allowed him to advance to the rival goal in attacking positions. He also had a strong shot so he was in charge of the free kicks on the right side of the field. Despite his abilities, Argentina's coach, Guillermo Stábile, did not call him up for the national team. Some versions state that he considered Sosa "dribbled excessively", preferring more aggressive players for defensive positions, such as Norberto Yácono or Juan Carlos Fonda.

In his own words

Honours
Boca Juniors
 Primera División: 1943, 1944
 Copa Ibarguren: 1944
 Copa de Competencia Británica: 1946
 Copa Escobar-Gerona: 1945, 1946

Argentina
 Copa América: 1945, 1946

References

 

1919 births
2009 deaths
Footballers from Buenos Aires
Argentine footballers
Argentina international footballers
Argentine expatriate footballers
Association football midfielders
Argentine Primera División players
Club Atlético Atlanta footballers
Boca Juniors footballers
Racing Club de France Football players
Red Star F.C. players
Expatriate footballers in France
Argentine expatriate sportspeople in France
Ligue 1 players
Ligue 2 players
Argentine football managers
Boca Juniors managers
Racing Club de Montevideo managers